Waynesville is an unincorporated community in Wayne Township, Dauphin County, Pennsylvania, United States, located in the Harrisburg–Carlisle metropolitan statistical area.

References

External links 
Waynesville Profile

Harrisburg–Carlisle metropolitan statistical area
Unincorporated communities in Dauphin County, Pennsylvania
Unincorporated communities in Pennsylvania